The Films, Videos, and Publications Classification Act 1993 is an Act of Parliament in New Zealand.

It repealed the Indecent Publications Act 1963, the Films Act 1983 and the Video Recordings Act 1987.

In 2015, the book Into the River was briefly placed under an interim restriction order under the Act, banning it completely from being sold or supplied.

See also
 Censorship in New Zealand

References

External links
 Text of the Act

Statutes of New Zealand
1993 in New Zealand law
Censorship in New Zealand
Media content ratings systems